Criorhina pachymera is a species of hoverfly in the family Syrphidae.

Distribution
The species can be seen in Austria.

References

Eristalinae
Diptera of Europe
Insects described in 1858
Taxa named by Johann Egger